Salarpur is a Block & village panchayat in Budaun district, Uttar Pradesh, India. Its block code is 0180. 67 panchayat of Budaun district comes under Salarpur block. According to 2011 Census of India, the total houses in Salarpur is 27,767 and total population is 1,68,197 out of 90,637 are males and 77,560 are females.

Villages under Salarpur block
Are the following:

Ahruiya
Akram Nagar Gadhi
Ambiya Pur
Amiliya
Anguiya
Arangabad Mafi
Asisa Barkhin
Aurangabad Khalsa
Azamganj Mandhiya
Babat
Badal
Bahorpura
Balliya
Banei
Bangavan
Barate Gadar
Bari Samspur
Barkhera
Bhagautipur
Bhaisamai
Bhajpura
Bhatauli
Bhinduliya Plasi
Bichhu Raiyya
Binavar
Chakaund
Chandaura
Dahemi
Darav Nagar
Dhakia
Gurupuri Binaik
Hasanpur
Kailee
Kunar
Kusaina
Shikrapur
Sikrodi
Silhari
Titauli
Usaita
Yusuf Nagar

References

Villages in Budaun district
Blocks in Budaun District